The following are the national records in athletics in Turkmenistan maintained by Amateur Athletic Federation of Turkmenistan (AAFT).

Outdoor

Key to tables:

h = hand timing

Men

Women

Indoor

Men

Women

References

External links

Turkmenistan
Records
Athletics
Athletics